P. lysimachiae may refer to:

 Papaipema lysimachiae, a moth of the family Noctuidae
 Pararrhaptica lysimachiae, a moth endemic to Kauai
 Phyllosticta lysimachiae, a sac fungus